Lee Jong-seok (born May 11, 1958) is a former South Korean Minister of Unification and chairman of the National Security Council, having succeeded Chung Dong-young on February 10, 2006. His appointment was controversial as certain lawmakers wanted to separate the two posts, while others were troubled by questions raised during his confirmation hearings over his apparent failure to properly brief President Roh Moo-hyun. Prior to his appointment, he had been the council's deputy chief.

He was a member of the ruling Uri Party. A graduate of Sungkyunkwan University who spent most of his career as an academic, he authored the 2000 book "Understanding Contemporary North Korea". He is widely seen as an important behind-the-scenes figure in South Korea's neutralist realignment in foreign policy between the United States and North Korea, working on the Sunshine Policy and accompanying Kim Dae-jung to the North Korean summit meeting in 2000.

Lee is now a senior researcher at the Sejong Institute in the southern Seoul suburb of Seongnam, Gyeonggi Province.

External links
"Roh Appoints Ministers Over Lawmakers' Objections", The Chosun Ilbo, February 10, 2006.
"Official and Unofficial Scrutiny of a Minister-to-Be", The Chosun Ilbo, February 6, 2006.
"New policymaker for North preceded by his reputation", The Joongang Daily, January 14, 2006.

Living people
Sungkyunkwan University alumni
Government ministers of South Korea
1958 births
People from Gyeonggi Province
Experts on North Korea